Thomas Orpe (1900 – after 1923) was an English footballer who played as a winger for Stafford Rangers, Stoke, and Port Vale.

Career
Orpe played for Stafford Rangers, Stoke and Hanley, before joining Second Division side Port Vale, initially on a trial basis, in November 1922. He scored on his debut, in a 2–0 win over Stockport County at Edgeley Park on 9 December. Seven days later he went on to score in a 2–0 win over Crystal Palace at The Old Recreation Ground. He fell out of favour in January 1923, as the man Opre replaced, Billy Harrison, was given another chance on the wing. Opre then developed cartilage problems and was released, most likely at the end of the 1922–23 season. He moved on to Cheadle New Haden.

Career statistics
Source:

References

1900 births
Year of death missing
Sportspeople from Hanley, Staffordshire
English footballers
Association football wingers
Stafford Rangers F.C. players
Stoke City F.C. players
Port Vale F.C. players
English Football League players